Yanni Voices (also released in Spanish as Yanni Voces) is the twelfth studio album and fifth live DVD by Yanni, released on Yanni/Wake label in 2009.

Background
This was Yanni's first studio release in six years. In collaboration with producer Ric Wake, Yanni showcased vocal artists singing to his classic songs, blending fresh interpretations of vintage Yanni tracks with newly written material. It also introduces the four new vocalists at the center of the project: Leslie Mills, Chloe Lowery, Nathan Pacheco, and Ender Thomas.

Disney Pearl Imprint released Yanni Voices and its Buena Vista Concerts division produced an extensive tour that began in April 2009. The tour kicked off with a special concert filmed Live at the Forum (Mundo Imperial) in Acapulco Mexico. This concert is the subject of a television special that aired in March 2009 on PBS.

Yanni Voces features a collection of Spanish duets with Latin recording artists and the new vocalists of Yanni Voices. Special guest performers included Lucero, Cristian Castro and José José.

Charts and sales
The album debuted on Billboard's Top 200 and #1 on the New Age chart.  The Spanish version, Yanni Voces, debuted at #2 on Billboard's New Age chart, #5 on the Latin Pop chart, and #13 on the Latin overall chart.

Yanni Voices received a debut sales week figure of 26,000 units on the Billboard chart dated April 11, 2009, a figure that was not surpassed in the Billboard new age category through at least October 2014.

Track listing

English version

Spanish version

Personnel
Vocals
Leslie Mills
Chloe Lowery
Nathan Pacheco
Ender Thomas

2009 North America concert tour

Set list
"Open/Santorini" (Orchestra)
"Unico Amore (Enchantment)" (Nathan)
"Nei Tuoi Occhi (In the Mirror)" (Chloe & Nathan)
"Ritual De Amore (Desire)" (Ender)
"Before the Night Ends" (Leslie)
"Within Attraction" (Orchestra)
"Change" (Chloe)
"Bajo El Cielo De Noviembre (November Sky)" (Ender)
"Mi Todo Eres Tu (Until the Last Moment)" (Chloe & Ender)
"Vivi Il Tuo Sogno (Almost a Whisper)" (Nathan)
"Duet" (Sam & Jason)
"Theory of Everything" (Leslie)
"Omaggio (Tribute)" (Nathan & Chloe)
"Our Days" (Chloe & Leslie)
"Susurro's En la Oscuridad" (Ender)
"Kill Me with Your Love" (Chloe)
"Cello" (Sasha)
"Amare Di Nuovo (Adagio in C Minor)" (Nathan)
"The Keeper" (Leslie)
"Marching Season" (Charlie & Yanni)
"Quedate Conmigo" (Chloe & Ender)
"Niki Nana" (Chloe & Everyone)

Encore
"Standing in Motion" (Orchestra)
"Nostalgia" (Orchestra)
"The Storm" (Orchestra)

Tour dates

Tour musicians
Charlie Adams - drums
Benedikt Brydern - violin
Ann Marie Calhoun - violin
April Cap - oboe
Jason Carder - trumpet
Lauren Chipman - viola
Yoel Del Sol - percussion
Victor Espinola - Paraguayan harp
Ming Freeman - keyboard
Cesar Lemos - guitar
Ilona Geller - viola
Kerry Hughes - trumpet
James Mattos - French horn
Armen Movsessian - violin
Sarah O'Brien - cello
Sylvio Richetto - keyboard
Anna Stafford - violin
Dana Teboe - trombone
Gabriel Vivas - bass
Erika Walczak - violin
Samvel Yervinyan - violin
Alexander Zhiroff - cello

2009 "Yanni Live in Concert" (Mexico)

Tour dates

References

External links
Official Website

Albums produced by Ric Wake
Yanni albums
2009 albums